Norsk Kollektiv Pensjonskasse was a life insurance company based in Bergen, Norway.

It was founded in 1938. In 1990 the owners decided to merge it with Hygea to create Vital Forsikring.

References

Insurance companies of Norway
Companies based in Bergen
Financial services companies established in 1938
1938 establishments in Norway
Financial services companies disestablished in 1990